Delphos is a city in Ringgold County, Iowa, United States. The population was 26 at the 2020 census.

Geography
Delphos is located at  (40.663172, -94.339517).

Demographics

2010 census
As of the census of 2010, there were 25 people, 11 households, and 7 families living in the city. The racial makeup of the city was 100.0% White.

There were 11 households, of which 18.2% had children under the age of 18 living with them, 63.6% were married couples living together, and 36.4% were non-families. 36.4% of all households were made up of individuals, and 18.2% had someone living alone who was 65 years of age or older. The average household size was 2.27 and the average family size was 3.00.

The median age in the city was 50.8 years. 24% of residents were under the age of 18; 0.0% were between the ages of 18 and 24; 16% were from 25 to 44; 32% were from 45 to 64; and 28% were 65 years of age or older. The gender makeup of the city was 48.0% male and 52.0% female.

2000 census
As of the census of 2000, there were 25 people, 12 households, and 6 families living in the city. The racial makeup of the city was 100.00% White.

There were 12 households, out of which 25.0% had children under the age of 18 living with them, 50.0% were married couples living together, and 50.0% were non-families. 41.7% of all households were made up of individuals, and 25.0% had someone living alone who was 65 years of age or older. The average household size was 2.08 and the average family size was 3.00.

In the city, the population was spread out, with 16.0% under the age of 18, 20.0% from 18 to 24, 12.0% from 25 to 44, 32.0% from 45 to 64, and 20.0% who were 65 years of age or older. The median age was 46 years. For every 100 females, there were 108.3 males. For every 100 females age 18 and over, there were 90.9 males.

The median income for a household in the city was $33,125, and the median income for a family was $33,125. Males had a median income of $0 versus $42,917 for females. The per capita income for the city was $13,925. None of the population and none of the families were below the poverty line.

Education
Mount Ayr Community School District operates public schools serving the community.

Notes

References

Cities in Iowa
Cities in Ringgold County, Iowa